South Bend Cemetery (also known as Old South Bend Cemetery and Silver Brook Cemetery) is a cemetery in Atlanta, Georgia near the Federal Penitentiary. The cemetery dates to the 1800s and was maintained by the South Bend Methodist Church, which was located about 6 blocks southwest at 850 Mcwilliams Road. The church disbanded in the 1990s. By 2008 the cemetery was overgrown. A group of volunteers cleared the overgrowth during 2008–2011.

References

External links
 
 

Cemeteries in Georgia (U.S. state)
Cemeteries in Atlanta
History of Atlanta